Overath is a town in the Rheinisch-Bergischer district of North Rhine-Westphalia, Germany.

Geography

Overath is located about 25 km east of Cologne, in the Bergisches Land. Despite the reclassification as a 'Stadt' (town, though the German understanding leans towards city) years ago due to surpassing the relevant population threshold, the former appellation Gemeinde (parish) seems more appropriate (particularly to the inhabitants) due to the spread-out villages it consists of.

The main settlement is in the Agger valley, with others spread on the hills surrounding it. The kleine Heckberg (small Heckberg, 348 m) near Federath is the highest point of Overath, and the whole Rheinisch-Bergischer Kreis.

Neighbouring cities are Rösrath in the West, Bergisch Gladbach in the North-West, Lindlar in the North-East, Engelskirchen in the East and Much, Neunkirchen-Seelscheid and Lohmar in the South.

Subdivisions

Overath is divided into 7 parts.
 Brombach
 Heiligenhaus
 Immekeppel
 Marialinden
 Steinenbrück
 Untereschbach
 Vilkerath

History

When first mentioned in 1060, Overath was called "Achera" (after the Agger river). Presumably because of the first settlement at a clearing (German Rodung) the name changed to "Ouerode" (about 1280), "Ovverode" (1304), "Overadt" (1582), and finally became "Overath".

Demographics

In 1939, the population of Overath was 6,500. In 1946, it already exceeded 10,500 and continued to grow to 15,500 in 1970. The area of the community was extended in 1975, which increased the population to over 20,000.

Since then it has risen further up to 27,106 in December 2005.

Religion

The Catholic church is devoted to Saint Walpurga (Heilige Walburga). Until 1803 the Benedictines had a monastery in Cyriax, a subsidiary of Michaelsberg Abbey at Siegburg.

The Catholic church in Heiligenhaus is devoted to Saint Roch (Heiliger Rochus).

Marialindens church (St. Mariä Heimsuchung) is a pilgrimage destination for Saint Mary.

Infrastructure

Transportation

Roads

The B 55 und B 484 federal roads (German Bundesstraßen) as well as the A 4 Autobahn pass through area of the town. The A 4 has got two exits to Overath, Overath-Untereschbach and Overath'''.

Air transport

The Cologne Bonn Airport is reachable within 25 minutes.

Public transport

The railway station in Overath connects the town with Cologne and Marienheide. The train heading for Cologne departs every 30 minutes, the train heading for Marienheide departs every 60 minutes. Cologne is reachable by train in within 35 minutes.

These traffic connections, together with rural surroundings, make Overath a popular place to live for commuters.

Healthcare

There is no hospital in Overath. The nearest hospitals are in Bergisch Gladbach and Engelskirchen.

Government

City council

The city council consists of 38 members. The current breakdown, from the general elections held September 26, 2004, is as follows:

Mayor
Christoph Nicodemus was elected mayor (German Bürgermeister) in September 2020, representing CDU, Greens and FDP.

Coat of arms

The coat of arms of Overath was only created on March 3, 1938. It consists of two areas:
 The upper area shows the lion of Berg. It symbolizes the former jurisdiction by the Earldom of Berg.
 The lower area shows a golden bell. It is supposed to symbolize a tradition of bell making. The inclusion of the bell is, however, due to a 15th and 16th century bell making family von Overra[i]de'' from Cologne, which falsely led to belief that bells were cast in Overath.

Twin towns – sister cities

Overath is twinned with:
 Colne Valley, England, United Kingdom
 Pérenchies, France

References

External links

  

Rheinisch-Bergischer Kreis
Districts of the Rhine Province